Acraea atatis is a butterfly in the family Nymphalidae. It is found in the Central African Republic.

Taxonomy
See Pierre & Bernaud, 2014

References 

Butterflies described in 2004
atatis
Endemic fauna of the Central African Republic
Butterflies of Africa